Matti Erik Rintakoski (b. September 18, 1924 in Hämeenlinna, Finland - d. June 28, 1995) was a professional ice hockey player who played in the SM-liiga. He played for Hämeenlinnan Tarmo. He was inducted into the Finnish Hockey Hall of Fame in 1985.

External links
Finnish Hockey Hall of Fame bio

1924 births
1995 deaths
Ice hockey players at the 1952 Winter Olympics
Olympic ice hockey players of Finland
People from Hämeenlinna
Sportspeople from Kanta-Häme